Patrick Ellis may refer to:
 Patrick Ellis (educator)
 Patrick Ellis (radio host)